This is a list of cliffs in Estonia.

References 

Cliffs